Chicharrón de queso or costra de queso is a popular food in Mexican cuisine. It consists in a crispy or semi-crispy cheese tortilla. In a comal or on a flattop grill, oil is added, the cheese is scattered and fried until reaching a firm consistency. This cheese may be folded and the excess of oil is absorbed with a towel. The chicharrón can be sprinkled with the juice of one lemon and  accompanied with a little chopped cilantro, diced tomato and diced onion.

References
 Bayless, Rick. Authentic Mexican. (2007). .

Mexican cuisine
Cheese dishes